Benjamin Fernand Lucien François Stambouli (born 13 August 1990) is a French professional footballer who plays as a defensive midfielder or centre-back for Süper Lig club Adana Demirspor.

Stambouli began his professional career with Montpellier, playing 130 games from 2010 to 2014 and winning Ligue 1 in 2012. After a season each with Tottenham Hotspur and Paris Saint-Germain – winning five domestic trophies with the latter – he signed for Schalke in 2016. Stambouli made 12 appearances for France at under-21 level from 2010 to 2012.

Early life
Benjamin Fernand Lucien François Stambouli was born on 13 August 1990 in Marseille, Bouches-du-Rhône. His father is Henri Stambouli, a former football player and the current youth director of French club Marseille. One of his grandfathers is former manager Gérard Banide.

Club career

Montpellier

Stambouli spent eight months as a child at Marseille, and also had two years at Sedan before joining the ranks of Montpellier in July 2004. On 3 March 2010, he signed his first professional contract, a three-year deal with Montpellier.

Stambouli made his professional debut on 8 August 2010 on the first day of the 2010–11 Ligue 1 season, playing the full 90 minutes of a 1–0 home win over Bordeaux. During the 2011–12 season, he played 26 league games as Montpellier won the Ligue 1 title for the first time in the club's history. During the 2013–14 season, Stambouli played 37 out of Montpellier's 38 league games and was promoted to position of vice-captain behind Brazilian Vitorino Hilton.

Tottenham Hotspur
On 1 September 2014, Stambouli signed for Premier League team Tottenham Hotspur for an undisclosed fee, rumoured to be in the region of £4.7 million. He scored his only goal for the club in a UEFA Europa League match against Partizan on 27 November, following up a shot from Roberto Soldado, which had rebounded off of the post. Stambouli appeared in every round of the League Cup as Tottenham reached the final at Wembley where, however, Stambouli was an unused substitute as Tottenham were beaten 2–0 by Chelsea. At the conclusion of his first year at Spurs, Stambouli had made just 12 appearances in the Premier League.

Paris Saint-Germain
On 20 July 2015, Paris Saint-Germain manager Laurent Blanc confirmed Stambouli would be joining PSG for a fee of £6 million, £1.3 million more than Tottenham had paid a year earlier. He made his debut on 1 August in the 2015 Trophée des Champions at the Stade Saputo in Montreal, playing the final 20 minutes in place of Marco Verratti in a 2–0 victory over Lyon. Stambouli played 40 total matches for PSG, winning all four domestic trophies in his one whole season, but did not score and assist and was unpopular with some fans due to his connections to their rival Marseille. His final match was the 2016 Trophée des Champions, which his team won 4–1 against Lyon in Austria.

Schalke 04
After spending only one season with the French champions, Stambouli joined Germany's Schalke 04 on a four-year contract on 26 August 2016. He made his debut on 9 September in a 2–0 home loss to reigning champions FC Bayern Munich. On 20 May, he was sent off for unsportsmanlike conduct in the last game of the season, a 1–1 draw at FC Ingolstadt 04, and suspended for two matches.

Stambouli suffered a metatarsal injury in October 2019, ruling him out for the rest of the season. On 4 August 2020, he extended his contract with Schalke until 2023. Due to a clause in that deal, he left following their relegation in May 2021.

Adana Demirspor
On 26 July 2021, Stambouli joined Turkish club Adana Demirspor on a two-year contract. He was one of a number of high-profile players joining the newly promoted Süper Lig club that summer, including Mario Balotelli.

International career
Stambouli played 14 times for France at under-21 level, from his debut on 8 October 2010 in a 2–0 friendly win over Turkey in Troyes.

Stambouli is eligible for the Algeria national team because his father was born there; in November 2018 he denied rumours that he would play for them.

Career statistics

Honours
Montpellier
Ligue 1: 2011–12

Tottenham Hotspur
Football League Cup runner-up: 2014–15

Paris Saint-Germain
Ligue 1: 2015–16
Coupe de France: 2015–16
Coupe de la Ligue: 2015–16
Trophée des Champions: 2015, 2016

References

External links

1990 births
Living people
Footballers from Marseille
French footballers
Association football defenders
Association football midfielders
Montpellier HSC players
Tottenham Hotspur F.C. players
Paris Saint-Germain F.C. players
FC Schalke 04 players
Adana Demirspor footballers
Ligue 1 players
Premier League players
Bundesliga players
Süper Lig players
French expatriate footballers
Expatriate footballers in England
Expatriate footballers in Germany
Expatriate footballers in Turkey
French expatriate sportspeople in England
French expatriate sportspeople in Germany
French expatriate sportspeople in Turkey
France under-21 international footballers
French sportspeople of Algerian descent